Andy Moeller is an American football coach and former player. He is the son of Gary Moeller. Moeller was a player for the Michigan Wolverines football team, and served with the team for eight years before joining the Baltimore Ravens. He replaced John Matsko in 2011 after Matsko was fired. In the spring of 2011, Moeller was arrested for DUI, and was sentenced to 60 days in jail, though all but two of the days were suspended; Moeller was also placed on probation. The arrest was his third alcohol-related in four years. The NFL eventually suspended Moeller for the first two games of the 2011 NFL season. After winning Super Bowl XLVII, Juan Castillo became the run game coordinator and the new offensive line coach, making Moeller the assistant OL coach. In September 2015, Moeller was suspended indefinitely by the Browns for allegedly assaulting a woman in his home. He and the Browns mutually parted ways before the teams' home opener on September 27, 2015.

References

External links
 Cleveland Browns bio

1960s births
Living people
American football linebackers
Army Black Knights football coaches
Baltimore Ravens coaches
Cleveland Browns coaches
Indiana Hoosiers football coaches
Michigan Wolverines football coaches
Michigan Wolverines football players
Missouri Tigers football coaches
Players of American football from Ann Arbor, Michigan